The Escondido mosque fire was a terrorist arson attack perpetrated against the Islamic Center of Escondido, California, in March 2019.

Police found graffiti on the mosque's driveway that referenced the Christchurch mosque shootings in New Zealand, leading them to consider the fire a terrorist attack. For over a month no suspect was identified. Then, on April 27, John T. Earnest entered the nearby Chabad of Poway synagogue and opened fire, killing one and injuring three others. An online posting from Earnest admitted responsibility for the mosque arson. No one was injured in the fire, and it was put out before extensive damage occurred.

Incident 
Dar-ul-Arqam mosque was set on fire on Sunday, March 24, 2019, at 3:15 am. The fire was extinguished before any major damage to the mosque or injuries occurred. Seven people were inside the Islamic center; one of them was awake when the fire started. They smelled smoke, saw the fire and tried to stop it before firefighters arrived. Finally, they managed to put out the fire before it caused any serious damage. Someone outside the building had noticed the fire and called 9-1-1.

The mosque's CCTV recorded an individual breaking the lock on the mosque's parking lot gate and entering there, before using a flammable liquid to set the mosque on fire. Escondido police lieutenant Chris Lick told the media that no suspect had been determined yet and that it looked like the fire was started by a chemical factor. Police said that they found graffiti referencing the Christchurch, New Zealand mosque incident in the parking lot.

Fire investigators, the San Diego County Sheriff's Bomb/Arson Unit, the FBI and the Bureau of Alcohol, Tobacco, Firearms and Explosives investigated the incident as arson and a hate crime. Police officers never reported the exact wording of the graffiti, although it was later revealed to have said, "For Brenton Tarrant -t. /pol/" (references to the Australian-born perpetrator of the shootings and attacks and to 8chan's /pol/ board to which both men belonged).

Reactions 
Yusef Miller, a spokesman for the Islamic community in Escondido, told Muslims who lived in the region to be cautious.

Dustin Craun, executive director of the San Diego office of the Council on American-Islamic Relations (CAIR), condemned the attack and asked the police for more security around the mosque and protection at Islamic institutions across California. Also, CAIR held online meetings with hundreds of mosques and urged them to increase their security.

A web page was set up on a crowdfunding site for donations to rebuild the mosque. During this campaign, more than 250 supporters donated over $5,000, far short of the ultimate goal of $20,000.

See also 
 Proposed demolition of Weizhou Grand Mosque
 Louisiana black church fires
 List of Islamophobic incidents
 List of terrorist incidents in March 2019
 Kabul mosque bombing 2019
 2019 Tripoli shooting

References 

2019 crimes in California
2019 fires in the United States
2019 in Islam
Anti-Muslim violence in the United States
Arson in California
Attacks on mosques
Attacks on religious buildings and structures in the United States
Escondido, California
Failed terrorist attempts in the United States
Hate crimes
Islamophobia in the United States
March 2019 crimes in the United States
March 2019 events in the United States
Neo-fascist terrorist incidents in the United States
Persecution of Muslims
Terrorist incidents in California
Terrorist incidents in the United States in 2019